Warren County Airport may refer to:

 Bowling Green-Warren County Regional Airport in Warren County, Kentucky, United States (FAA: BWG) 
 Floyd Bennett Memorial Airport in Warren County, New York, United States (FAA: GFL)
 Front Royal-Warren County Airport in Warren County, Virginia, United States (FAA: FRR)
 Lebanon-Warren County Airport in Warren County, Ohio, United States (FAA: I68)
 Warren County Memorial Airport in Warren County, Tennessee, United States (FAA: RNC)